Mark Achtman FRS is Professor of Bacterial Population Genetics at Warwick Medical School, part of the University of Warwick in the UK.

Education
Achtman was educated at the University of Manitoba where he was awarded a Master of Science degree in 1965 for research on hemagglutination in adenovirus. He went on to complete a PhD on bacterial fertility factor at the University of California, Berkeley in 1969.

Research
Achtman's research interests are in the population genetics of pathogenic bacteria such as Vibrio cholerae, Salmonella, Yersinia pestis, Neisseria meningitidis, Escherichia coli, Helicobacter pylori, and Bordetella. Achtman was one of the inventors of multilocus sequence typing. His research has been funded by the Biotechnology and Biological Sciences Research Council (BBSRC) and Medical Research Council (MRC).

Awards and honours
Achtman was elected a Fellow of the Royal Society (FRS) in 2015. His nomination reads:

References

Geneticist

Living people
Fellows of the Royal Society
Year of birth missing (living people)